Jaco Johannes Sieberhagen (born 25 January 1961) is a South African sculptor.  He usually creates sculptures of people and animals using wood, metal, and glass.  His metal figures are almost always depicted in a silhouette style, using laser-cutting techniques. The wood in his sculptures is usually found and collected driftwood.  He describes the scenes he creates as "landscapes of the mind."

Education
Sieberhagen received his BA from the University of Port Elizabeth in 1981, a BTh from Stellenbosch University in 1984, his Licentiate in Theology from Stellenbosch University in 1985 and a Diploma in Fundraising Management from UNISA in 1994. He also studied sculpture at Rhodes University from 1987 to 1990.

References

1961 births
Living people
People from Victoria West
South African sculptors
Stellenbosch University alumni
Rhodes University alumni